Cymindis ornata is a species of ground beetle in the subfamily Harpalinae. It was described by Fischer Von Waldheim in 1823.

References

ornata
Beetles described in 1823